The Marajoara or Marajó culture was an ancient pre-Columbian era civilization.

Marajoara may also refer to:

 Something from, or related to, the island of Marajó
 Marajoara gulf, a bay
 Operation Marajoara, a 1970s guerrilla counter-operation
 Marajoara (horse), a Brazilian horse breed
 A seldom used name for Curatella americana